Nesjahverfi is a village located in Hornafjörður, a fjord region in southeastern Iceland. The population is of around 92 inhabitants in 2018.

References 

Populated places in Iceland
Pages using the Kartographer extension
Coordinates on Wikidata